Joe Stanley (born 13 April 1957) is a former rugby union player. He was born in Auckland, New Zealand.

Career
Stanley played for Ponsonby RFC and Auckland in the National Provincial Championship, and New Zealand as a centre. Joe is a member of the Stanley family which includes Chase and Benson

Personal life
Joe Stanley is a cousin of footballer Tim Cahill. He is also the father of former All Black Jeremy Stanley. Also related to Michael Stanley, Samoan number 13. He is also the uncle of Sam Stanley (English Rugby Union player with Esher). His daughter is Brooke Stanley Pao.

References

External links

1957 births
Living people
Rugby union players from Auckland
People from Auckland
New Zealand international rugby union players
New Zealand rugby union players
Auckland rugby union players
Rugby union centres
Joe
New Zealand sportspeople of Samoan descent